Una Europa is an international network of European research-intensive universities. Launched in early 2019, the alliance is headquartered in Brussels, Belgium and connects eleven universities, nine of which are in the European Union. Taken together, the participating universities teach almost 500,000 students with over 75,000 staff.

The network was formed in response to the European Commission's European Universities Initiative launched in 2017, which aims to create several transnational alliances of universities across Europe. The proposal for Una Europa was selected by the European Commission for funding in its first call in 2019, and became operational the same year. Some of Una Europa's initiatives have received additional funds from the European Union's Horizon programmes (previously known as the Framework Programmes for Research and Technological Development) intended to foster cooperation in the European Research Area.

The network's ultimate goal is an integrated multinational university that enables student and staff mobility between its member institutions. This involves the creation of shared professorships, transnational double degrees, doctoral programs, and research projects. The cooperation will focus on five main areas: cultural heritage, data science and artificial intelligence, European studies, public health, and sustainability.

Members

See also 

 List of higher education associations and alliances

References

External links 

 una-europa.eu

College and university associations and consortia in Europe